Binboğa is a Turkish word, and may refer to:

People
Ali Rıza Binboğa (born 1950), Turkish singer

Places
Binboğa, Afşin, a village in Afşin district of Kahramanmaraş, Turkey
Binboğa Mountains, a mountain range in southern Turkey